Caenosynteles is a monotypic moth genus in the family Geometridae. Its only species, Caenosynteles haploaria, is found in Mexico. Both the genus and species were described by Harrison Gray Dyar Jr. in 1912.

References

Archiearinae
Geometridae genera
Monotypic moth genera